The Hofkirche (Court Church) is a Gothic church located in the Altstadt (Old Town) section of Innsbruck, Austria. The church was built in 1553 by Emperor Ferdinand I (1503–1564) as a memorial to his grandfather Emperor Maximilian I (1459–1519), whose cenotaph within boasts a remarkable collection of German Renaissance sculpture. The church also contains the tomb of Andreas Hofer, Tyrol's national hero.

Although Maximilian's will had directed that he be buried in the castle chapel in Wiener Neustadt, it proved impractical to construct there the large memorial whose plans he had supervised in detail, and Ferdinand I as executor planned construction of a new church and monastery in Innsbruck for a suitable memorial. In the end, however, Maximilian's simple tomb remained in Wiener Neustadt and the Hofkirche serves as a cenotaph.

Church
The Hofkirche is located at Universitätsstraße 2, adjacent to the Hofburg in the Altstadt section of Innsbruck. The church was designed by architect Andrea Crivelli of Trento in the traditional German form of a hall church, consisting of three naves with a setback three-sided choir, round and pointed arch windows, and a steep broken hip roof. Its layered buttresses reflect compromise of contemporary Renaissance design with German late Gothic style. Stonemasons Hieronymus de Longhi and Anton de Bol carved the fine Renaissance portal.

The church interior contains galleries, high slender colonnettes of red marble with white stylized Corinthian capitals, and a lectern. The gallery's original ribs made from sandstone from Mittenwald have been preserved, but after the main vault was damaged by earthquake in the 17th century, it was rebuilt in the Baroque style.

The high altar seen today was designed in 1755 by the Viennese court architect Nikolaus Pacassi, and decorated with a crucifixion by the Viennese academic painter Johann Carl Auerbach, and bronze statues of Saint Francis of Assisi and Saint Teresa of Ávila by Innsbruck court sculptor Balthasar Moll (1768). The Renaissance organ (1560) is by Jörg Ebert of Ravensburg, and described locally as one of the five most famous organs in the world. Domenico Pozzo from Milan painted the organ panels.

A side chapel, called the Silver Chapel (Silberne Kapell), was consecrated in 1578. It contains a silver altar to Mary incorporating three elephant tusks and three hundred kilos of ebony, and the tombs of Archduke Ferdinand II and his wife Philippine Welser—both by Alexander Colyn.

Cenotaph

Emperor Maximilian's ornate black marble cenotaph occupies the center of the nave. Florian Abel, of the Prague imperial court, supplied a full-sized draft of the high tomb in the florid style of court Mannerism. Its construction took more than 80 years. The sarcophagus itself was completed in 1572, and the final embellishments—the kneeling emperor, the four virtues, and the iron grille—were added in 1584.

Trento mason Hieronymus Longi directed construction of the tomb proper. The base of the tomb consists of Hagau marble, a Jurassic limestone found in the North Tyrol and used as a building stone throughout western Austria. The bronze relief frieze of trophies includes vases, suits of armor, weapons, shields, musical instruments, etc., and above that two rows of white marble reliefs. The 24 reliefs were created by the artist Alexander Colin, based on woodcuts from The Triumphal Arch (Ehrenpforte) by Albrecht Dürer, with four stone bas-reliefs each on the tomb's ends, and eight on its longer sides. They depict events from Maximilian's life as follows: 
 Marriage of Maximilian to Mary of Burgundy, 1477
 Victory over the French at the First Battle of Guinegate, 1478
 Recapture of Arras fortress, 1492
 Maximilian's coronation as King of the Romans in Aachen, 1486
 Victory of Archduke Sigmund of Tyrol over the Venetians at Calliano, 1487
 Maximilian's liberation of Vienna from Hungarian Rule, 1490
 Capture of Stuhlweissenburg, 1490
 Return of Maximilian's daughter Margarethe by the French King, 1493
 Retreat of the Turks from Croatia, 1493
 Alliance of the Holy League against France, 1494
 Maximilian's Wedding with Bianca Maria Sforza, 1494
 Marriage of Philip the Fair to Joanna of Castile, 1496
 Victory of Maximilian over the Bohemians near Regensburg, 1504
 Capture of Kufstein Fortress, 1504
 Subjugation of the Duke of Guelders, 1505
 Alliance of Cambrai against Venice, 1508
 Victory over Venice, 1509
 Return of Duke Maximilian Sforza to Milan, 1512
 Victory over the French at the Second Battle of Guinegate, 1513
 Maximilian and King Henry VIII of England meet at Thérouanne, 1513
 Defeat of the Venetians near Vicenza, 1513
 Capture of the Venetian Fortress of Murano, 1514
 Betrothal of Maximilian's grandson Ferdinand to Anne of Bohemia and Hungary, 1515
 Defense of Verona, 1516

The tomb is enclosed within a fine wrought iron grille created by Jörg Schmidhammer of the Prague court, based on a drawing by the Innsbruck painter Paul Trabel, and capped with statues of the four virtues and kneeling emperor cast in Mühlau from models by Alexander Colin.

Statues 

The cenotaph is surrounded by 28 large bronze statues (200–250 cm) of ancestors, relatives and heroes. Their creation took place between 1502 and 1555, and occupied a number of artists including Christian Amberger, Albrecht Dürer, Jörg Kölderer, Jörg Polhamer the elder, Gilg Sesselschreiber, Ulrich Tiefenbrunn, and sculptors Peter Vischer the Elder, Hans Leinberger, G. Löffler, Leonhart Magt, and Veit Stoß. Three of the statues are based on designs by Dürer. According to David Gass, one of many descendants of both Maximilian and Louis II of Hungary, the inclusion of the King Arthur and Godfrey of Bouillon statues was owing to Louis II's sister, Anna, the Queen of Bohemia's having married Ferdinand, Maximilian's grandson, and having brought her English heritage with her. Both men were said to have been her ancestors. The following list includes the statues (clockwise from the left of the altar), with the designer, sculptor, cast, and year of execution of each:

 Joanna, Queen of Castile († 1555), 
 Ferdinand II, King of Aragon († 1516), 
 Philip the Good, Duke of Burgundy († 1467), 
 Charles the Bold, Duke of Burgundy († 1477), 
 Cymburgis, Archduchess of Austria († 1429), 
 Margaret, Duchess of Savoy († 1530), 
 Bianca Maria Sforza, Holy Roman Empress († 1511), 
 Sigismund, Archduke of Austria († 1496), 
 Arthur, King of Britain († 6th century), 
 Ferdinand I, King of Portugal († 1383), 
 Ernest, Duke of Austria († 1424), 
 Theoderic the Great, King of the Ostrogoths († 526), 
 Albert II, Duke of Austria († 1358), 
 Rudolph I, King of Germany († 1291), 
 Philip I, King of Castile († 1506), 
 Clovis I, King of the Franks († 511), 
 Albert II, King of Germany († 1439), 
 Frederick III, Holy Roman Emperor († 1493), 
 Leopold III, Margrave of Austria († 1136), 
 Albert IV, Count of Habsburg († 1239), 
 Leopold III, Duke of Austria († 1386), 
 Frederick IV, Duke of Austria with the Empty Pockets († 1439), 
 Albert I, King of Germany († 1308), 
 Godfrey of Bouillon († 1100), 
 Elizabeth of Luxembourg, Queen of Germany († 1443), 
 Mary, Duchess of Burgundy († 1482), 
 Elizabeth of Carinthia, Queen of Germany († 1313), 
 Kunigunde, Archduchess of Austria († 1520), 

The gallery contains 23 small statues (66–69 cm) of the Habsburg patron saints. They were designed by court painter Jörg Köldere around 1514/15, and carved into wood and then wax by Leonhard Magt. The church also once contained a number of busts of Roman emperors; 20 are now displayed in Schloß Ambras and one is in the Bavarian National Museum in Munich.

Andreas Hofer tomb
Andreas Hofer, Tirol's national hero, is also buried within the church. Sculptor Johann Nepomuk Schaller made his statue; Josef Klieber created the relief of the "Fahnenschwur" (Swearing on the flag) based on a sketch by Josef Martin Schärmer.

Gallery

References
Citations

Bibliography

External links

 Hofkirche official website
 Hofkirche at Sacred Destinations
 Hofkirche 

16th-century Roman Catholic church buildings in Austria
Roman Catholic churches completed in 1553
Buildings and structures in Innsbruck
Monuments and memorials in Austria
Tourist attractions in Innsbruck
Museums in Innsbruck
Religious museums in Austria
1553 establishments in Austria
Establishments in the Princely County of Tyrol